Tāpapakanga Regional Park is a regional park situated in the Auckland Region of New Zealand's North Island. It is located in Franklin, east of Kawakawa Bay, and is owned and operated by Auckland Council.

History

The land was an important place for the Marutūāhu iwi of the Hauraki Gulf, in particular Ngāti Whanaunga, and it was a traditional area for stonefield gardening. In 1899, settler James Ashby settled on the land, building a kauri homestead with his wife Rebecca in 1900. Ashby developed a lifelong friendship with Ngāti Whanaunga chief Tukumana Te Taniwha. Two pou are found in the regional park, one of which features a carving of James Ashby.

The regional park opened in 1995.

Gallery

References 

Franklin Local Board Area
Parks in the Auckland Region
Regional parks of New Zealand
Tourist attractions in the Auckland Region